is a former Japanese professional footballer who last play as a defender. He last play for Japan national team until 2013.

Club career
Komano played for his local junior high school team. He was invited for trials from several clubs including Gamba Osaka, JEF United Ichihara, Sanfrecce Hiroshima and local high school powerhouse Hatsushiba Hashimoto. He decided to join Sanfrecce Hiroshima youth team and entered Yoshida High School in Hiroshima.

Komano has been the first-choice right back for the club since 2001 when he is available. He suffered from several serious injuries and illnesses. He damaged the cruciate ligaments of his left knee in the match against Yokohama FC on 16 August 2003. While he was in hospital, he suffered from a venous thrombosis. Because of these, he was sidelined until April 2004. He broke his left collar bone in an Olympic game against Ghana in August 2004. In September of the same year, he also suffered from a uveitis problem that might have caused blindness. Komano moved to Júbilo Iwata for the 2008 season after Hiroshima was relegated to J2 League.

Komano played as regular right side-back and played all 34 matches every season until 2013 except 2010 season for injury. However Júbilo was relegated to J2 League end of 2014 season. He played many matches in 2 seasons in J2, Júbilo returned to J1 end of 2015 season.

In 2016, Komano moved to FC Tokyo. However he could hardly play in the match behind young player Ryoya Ogawa.

In July 2016, Komano moved to Avispa Fukuoka. Although he played many matches, Avispa finished at the bottom place in 2016 season and was relegated to J2 League. Although he played as regular player in 2017, his opportunity to play decreased in 2018 and he left the club end of 2018 season.

In 2019, Komano signed with Japan Football League club FC Imabari.

In 2022, Komano announcement retirement from football in 2022 after 23 years play for professional football career.

International career
In June 2001, Komano was selected Japan U20 national team for 2001 World Youth Championship. At this tournament, he played full-time in all 3 matches as left side midfielder and left side back. In August 2004, he represented Japan U23 national team at the 2004 Olympics and he played two matches as left side back and left side midfielder.

He made his full international debut for Japan national team on 3 August 2005 in an 2005 East Asian Football Championship match against China. He was a member of the Japan team for the 2006 World Cup finals as a backup for first-choice Akira Kaji. Because of Kaji's injury, Komano played in Japan's opening game against Australia. He was also a member for the 2007 Asian Cup finals. He played all the Japan games except one for which he wasn't eligible due to suspension.

On 29 June 2010, Komano missed a penalty in a penalty shoot-out against Paraguay as Japan lost 5–3 in the 2010 World Cup second round.

Komano scored his first international goal in a friendly against Tajikistan on 11 October 2011 at Nagai Stadium. He played 78 games and scored 1 goal for Japan until 2013.

Career statistics 

.

Club

International 

Score and result list Japan's goal tally first, score column indicates score after Komano goal.

Honours
Júbilo Iwata
J.League Cup: 2010
Suruga Bank Championship: 2011

Japan
EAFF East Asian Cup: 2013

Individual
J.League Best XI: 2012

References

External links
 
 Profile at Instagram
 
 Profile at Twitter
 Japan National Football Team Database
 
 Profile at Avispa Fukuoka 

1981 births
Living people
Association football people from Wakayama Prefecture
Japanese footballers
Japan youth international footballers
Japan international footballers
J1 League players
J2 League players
J3 League players
Japan Football League players
Sanfrecce Hiroshima players
Júbilo Iwata players
FC Tokyo players
FC Tokyo U-23 players
Avispa Fukuoka players
FC Imabari players
Footballers at the 2002 Asian Games
Asian Games silver medalists for Japan
Asian Games medalists in football
Olympic footballers of Japan
Footballers at the 2004 Summer Olympics
2006 FIFA World Cup players
2007 AFC Asian Cup players
2010 FIFA World Cup players
Medalists at the 2002 Asian Games
Association football defenders